Nenad Delić (born April 22, 1984) is a Croatian professional basketball Center who plays for Étoile Sportive du Sahel of Tunisian Division I.

External links
 Eurobasket Profile
 FIBA.Basketball Profile
 RealGM Profile
 BalkanLeague Profile
 ChampionsLeague Profile
 ZvoneBasket Profile

References

1984 births
Living people
Croatian men's basketball players
Centers (basketball)
Basketball players from Split, Croatia
Croatian expatriate basketball people in Germany
KK Vrijednosnice Osijek players
ÍR men's basketball players
Úrvalsdeild karla (basketball) players
MBK Handlová players